Carmiña Giraldo (born 6 August 1976) is a Colombian former professional tennis player.

Biography
Giraldo comes from the city of Pereira in Risaralda and is the elder sister of Colombian Davis Cup competitor Santiago Giraldo, who is the country's highest ever ranked male player.

From 1992 to 1997, Giraldo represented the Colombia Fed Cup team in a total of 23 ties. Her biggest performances at Fed Cup level include partnering Cecilia Hincapié in a doubles win over Chile in the 1993 World Group Play-off, secured 13–11 in the third set, to prevent Colombia being demoted. In a 1994 World Group tie against Germany she took the second set off top 20 player Anke Huber in a singles rubber, before losing in the third.

Giraldo reached her best singles ranking of 256 in 1997 and left the professional tour at the end of the year to attend Clemson University in the United States. As a member of the Clemson Tigers women's tennis team she earned All-ACC selection in both 1999 and 2000.

Graduating in 2001, Giraldo never returned full-time to the tour, but did make a comeback as a wildcard at the 2001 Copa Colsanitas, a WTA Tour tournament in her home country. She lost to Eva Martincová in the first round of the singles but made the quarter-finals of the doubles, partnering Catalina Castaño.

ITF finals

Singles (3–2)

Doubles (1–10)

References

External links
 
 
 

1976 births
Living people
Colombian female tennis players
Clemson Tigers women's tennis players
People from Pereira, Colombia
20th-century Colombian women
21st-century Colombian women